An audio commentary is an additional audio track, usually digital, consisting of a lecture or comments by one or more speakers, that plays in real time with a video. Commentaries can be serious or entertaining in nature, and can add information which otherwise would not be disclosed to audience members.

Types of commentary 

The DVD medium allows multiple audio tracks for each video program. DVD players usually allow these to be selected by the viewer from the main menu of the DVD or using the remote. These tracks will contain dialogue and sound of the movie, often with alternative tracks featuring different language dialogue, or various types of audio encoding (such as Dolby Digital, DTS or PCM). Among them may be at least one commentary track.

There are several different types of commentary. The two main types simply define the length of the commentary rather than the type of content. They are:
Partial or scene-specific, which only covers selected scenes of the film. Sometimes these are recorded without the speaker viewing the film and thus the commentator may make more general comments than pointing out specific details.
Feature-length or screen-specific, which is recorded in one session: the speakers watch the movie from beginning to end and give their thoughts directly based on what is happening on-screen.

Typically a commentary track will include feature-length commentary from the film's director, cast members, or occasionally writers and producers. Occasionally actors will perform commentary in-character. (In recording sessions with multiple speakers, a designated moderator may encourage the discussion flow.) Some DVDs include outsider commentary performed by film critics, historians, scholars or fans. In more elaborate productions, multiple speakers from various recording sessions may be edited together for a single audio program.

Some DVDs feature commentaries with on-screen video enhancements, such as telestrator prompts, (allowing the director or commentator to "draw" on the screen, pointing out specific details), or the Ghostbusters "video commentary", where one of the subtitle tracks is used to add silhouettes of the speakers in a manner where they seem to be in a theater commenting on the movie as it was screened for them in the style of Mystery Science Theater 3000. Less common are actual video commentaries, showing the speakers as they are recording the commentary, requiring separate video tracks.

History 
The value of audio commentaries as a marketing tool was revealed during the heyday of Laserdisc, the laser-based video format produced before the introduction of DVDs. The Criterion Collection company, for example, produced high-quality "deluxe" editions of classic films on Laserdisc, using the best available prints and re-edited versions. These were often very expensive compared to today's DVDs and included bonus material such as trailers, deleted scenes, production stills, behind-the-scenes information, and audio commentaries from the directors, producers, cast, cinematographers, editors, and production designers. They were marketed to movie professionals, fans and scholars who were seen as an elite niche of consumers who could afford to pay more for definitive, quality editions. The audio commentaries on laserdiscs were typically encoded on secondary analog tracks which had become redundant, as modern Laserdiscs had stereo audio encoded digitally alongside. This is why certain older videodisc players, which pre-date the digital audio standard, are only able to play back analog tracks with audio commentary.

The first audio commentary was featured on the Criterion Collection release of the original King Kong film, on laserdisc in December 1984. It featured film historian Ronald Haver and his first words were:

The idea for the commentary track arose in the film-to-tape transfer room when laserdisc producers, Peter Crown and Jennifer Scanlin of Romulus Productions, Inc., thrilled by Haver's incredible commentary, suggested to Bob Stein and Roger Smith that this material needed to be included on the disc. They played back the completed movie as Ron watched and ad libbed his comments.

The decline of the Laserdisc format and the increasing popularity of DVD was highlighted in the fall of 1997, when simultaneous Laserdisc and DVD editions of the movie Contact were released. The former contained one bonus audio commentary track by director Robert Zemeckis, and producer Steve Starkey. However, the DVD contained two additional, separate audio commentaries (by Jodie Foster and the special effects producers), as well as other bonus features. Despite its history with laserdiscs, the idea of audio commentary was still such an uncommon notion that, in its January 1998 review of the Contact DVD, Entertainment Weekly scoffed, "Who in the universe would want to journey through more than eight hours of gassy, how-we-filmed-the-nebulae trivia included in this "Special Edition" disc? Meant to show off DVD's enormous storage capacity, it only demonstrates its capacity to accommodate mountains of filler."

In general, directors are open to recording commentary tracks, as many feel it can be helpful to young filmmakers, or they simply want to explain their intention in making the film. Eli Roth, for example, specifically states on the producer's commentary track for The Last Exorcism, that he and the other filmmakers will offer advice to people interested in making films, as well as film school students. He is a strong proponent of the educational use of audio commentary, having recorded five commentary tracks for his debut, Cabin Fever. He also recorded insightful commentary tracks, with Quentin Tarantino, for both Hostel films, in which the two horror movie fans share film-making anecdotes and offer advice on working in the movie business. Meanwhile, others (such as Steven Spielberg, Joe Johnston, Clint Eastwood, M. Night Shyamalan & David Lynch) feel commentary can de-mystify and cheapen a movie. Director Steven Spielberg has not recorded commentary tracks for any of his films. He feels that the experience of watching a film with anything other than his intended soundtrack detracts from what he has created. Woody Allen has a similar lack of enthusiasm for commentaries, stating, "I'm not interested in all that extra stuff. [...] I want my films to speak for themselves. And hopefully they do." Similarity, some of Joe Johnston's movies handled commentary by the special effects team (like Jurassic Park III and Jumanji), and by the author (October Sky). The only exception to this rule was Captain America: The First Avenger.

Notable DVD audio commentaries 

A number of films and music videos released today feature audio commentaries. While many of them will not hold the interest of the casual viewer, specific releases stand out, mainly those with elements of historical interest or subject-specific information from expert advisors. For example, the inventor of the steadicam, featured throughout the audio commentary track for The Shining, discusses his work with the ground-breaking technology in several films leading up to that landmark production. Non-movie buffs may be interested in the anecdotes offered by advisors to the filmmakers, such as the FBI profiler commenting on The Silence of the Lambs (Criterion DVD release). Filmmakers and cast may reveal stories from behind the scenes, explain the process involved in their work, or simply offer additional laughs.

Films 
 The science-fiction movie Sunshine (directed by Danny Boyle) contains an audio track with physicist Brian Cox. The author and professor, who served as an advisor on the production, discusses scientific accuracies (and inaccuracies) depicted in the movie.
 The 2009 Blu-ray edition of the film Galaxy Quest includes a tongue-in-cheek trivia commentary called "Galactopedia". Written by Michael Okuda and Denise Okuda, the Galactopedia purports to be based on Galaxy Quest encyclopedias, technical manuals, and other imaginary books that presumably come from the universe in which Galaxy Quest was a real TV show.
 The Halestorm Entertainment movie Sons of Provo features a commentary on the film, and then a commentary on the commentary, where they discuss what they said in the commentary.
 The DVD release of Ghostbusters contains a "video commentary" track with director Ivan Reitman, writer/star Harold Ramis, and associate producer Joe Medjuck. Silhouettes of the trio were added to the picture using one of the subtitle tracks, in a manner that made it seem as if they were sitting in a theater commenting on the movie as it was screened for them. This was seen as a homage to (or imitation of) Mystery Science Theater 3000. In some scenes, arrows, lines, or circles may be drawn onto the screen to highlight things the directors are talking about. The DVD releases of Men in Black and Muppets from Space had similar features.
 The DVD release of Fantasia features two separate commentaries: one by Roy E. Disney, James Levine, John Canemaker, and Scott MacQueen; and a second by Walt Disney, created using audio clips of interviews and a voice actor reading his production meeting notes, hosted by Canemaker. When its sequel, Fantasia 2000, was released on DVD, it also included two separate audio commentaries: One featuring Roy E. Disney, Levine, and Canemaker, and the other featuring commentary on each of the separate segments of the film by the directors and art directors of each segment. For the sections starring Mickey Mouse ("The Sorcerer's Apprentice") and Donald Duck ("Pomp and Circumstance"), voice actors Wayne Allwine and Tony Anselmo were used to make it seem as though Mickey and Donald were providing their own commentary on their appearances in the film.
 The DVD releases for Atlantis: The Lost Empire (Special Edition), Treasure Planet and Finding Nemo contained specially-edited "video commentaries"; the feature-length audio commentaries by the directors and producers were punctuated by cues to video segments illustrating various behind-the-scenes aspects. Similarly, in several commentaries on the first season of Lost, the commentators would actually stop the episode's progress and play behind-the-scenes clips, continuing to talk over the footage.
The DVD release of the third season of How I Met Your Mother includes a commentary by Jason Segel and Chris Harris for the episode "The Chain of Screaming". Harris, a writer on the show, did not write this particular episode, but was included in the commentary at the request of Segel, who spent the majority of the commentary intoxicated and in only his boxers. Segel at one point places 12 condoms on the table between the two and spends the majority of the commentary insinuating a relationship between him and Harris, much to Harris' chagrin.
 The 2000 DVD of This Is Spinal Tap features a commentary by the three members of the band, in character. They relate how they felt slighted by the film, and how the director (Marty di Bergi in the film) did a "hack job" with the documentary. The commentary is another added element to the fiction of the band. Actors Michael McKean, Christopher Guest and Harry Shearer had previously recorded a commentary for a Criterion Collection DVD which had gone out of print. Similarly, the DVD of series 1 of the BBC sitcom I'm Alan Partridge features commentary from the characters of Alan and his assistant, Lynne. Like Spinal Tap, Alan is heard to be frustrated at how the show makes him appear.
 The Ultimate Matrix Collection, a box set of the entire Matrix trilogy, has two audio commentaries on each film — one by philosophers who loved it (Dr. Cornel West and Ken Wilber), and one by critics who hated it (Todd McCarthy, John Powers and David Thomson).
 The commentary on Trey Parker's Cannibal! The Musical (aka Alferd Packer: The Musical) is notable in that the commentators — cast and crew — start out sober at the beginning. As the movie progresses, the group drinks and gets more and more inebriated. A similar commentary, featuring many of the participants from that commentary, was recorded for Orgazmo.
 The fourth, fifth and sixth season box sets of The Simpsons contain special "illustrated commentaries" on selected episodes, where two animation directors draw on screen while commenting on the episode. This is achieved by using subtitle data to produce the drawings overlaid on top of the video in sync with the audio commentary track.
 The Simpsons and Futurama, both Matt Groening creations, are among the few TV series to have audio commentary tracks on every episode in their season box set DVD releases. For Futurama, the commentators point out who voiced minor characters. The actors for these characters are otherwise unlisted in the ending credits. Doctor Who, Mr. Show, Red Dwarf, volumes 4 and onwards of Family Guy, the first season sets of Twin Peaks, The Shield and Goodnight Sweetheart and all episodes and specials of The League of Gentlemen are other examples of this.
 The commentary for Eurotrip has the writers and director playing a drinking game to their own film, while giving a commentary.
 When the first season of Veronica Mars was rushed to DVD so first-time viewers could catch up before the second season began airing in Fall 2005, the creator, Rob Thomas, recorded an audio commentary for the pilot which was a downloadable podcast because there was not time to get it on the boxed set.
 In lieu of recording a commentary himself, Michael Moore allowed his interns and secretary to record the audio commentary for his documentary Bowling for Columbine.
 On the DVD release of Shaun of the Dead, one (of the four) commentary tracks is given over entirely to a recording of the actors who played zombies in the movie. The first cast audio commentary (including Simon Pegg, Nick Frost, Kate Ashfield, Lucy Davis and Dylan Moran) also mocks audio commentaries as the cast admit that they almost never listen to them (with Pegg claiming he listens to them when going to sleep), as well as Moran saying that they simply involve people saying things like "oh, we used a steadi-cam for that one because Roger had a bad knee", and that no-one was interested in hearing it.
 There is a fake commentary on the DVD of Dodgeball: A True Underdog Story with Rawson Marshall Thurber, Vince Vaughn and Ben Stiller arguing. 40 minutes into it, all three exit and the commentary is replaced with the audio commentary from There's Something About Mary. The real audio commentary can be found as an Easter egg on the DVD.
 On the audio commentaries for seasons of The Venture Bros., Jackson Publick and Doc Hammer have conversations that have little to do with the episodes being shown.
 On the cast and crew commentary for Superbad, Judd Apatow orders the actors not to swear in front of his nine-year-old daughter Maude, who is also present for the recording. Actor Jonah Hill restrains himself from cursing until halfway through the movie, and he proceeds to chide Apatow for "Bring Your Daughter to Work Day." After this argument, Apatow and his daughter leave to go attend a showing of the Broadway musical Spamalot, and the remaining cast and crew begin swearing profusely immediately after their departure.
 The cast commentary of Tropic Thunder features Ben Stiller and Jack Black as themselves, while Robert Downey Jr. is in character as Lincoln Osiris, and later Kirk Lazarus, before dropping character at the end. This is a reference to a line spoken in the film by Lazarus: "I don't drop character 'til I've done the DVD commentary."
 The unrated DVD for Anchorman: The Legend of Ron Burgundy contains a commentary track where the director Adam McKay, Will Ferrell, and David Koechner get into a fight because Koechner thinks he had too little parts in the movie, and Andy Richter and Kyle Gass get into a fight because they did not get into the movie, leading one of them to punch Ferrell in the nose.
 The commentary track for Step Brothers features the director Adam McKay, Will Ferrell, and John C. Reilly doing the bulk of the commentary as a musical performance accompanied by film composer Jon Brion and Los Angeles Clippers player Baron Davis.
 The audio commentary for Brother Bear was not by the filmmakers, but the actors Dave Thomas and Rick Moranis in character as the wise-cracking comical moose, Rutt & Tuke. It is also written as 'hilarious' on the DVD cover.
 The 2007 DVD for The Fountain did not include a commentary track because Warner Bros. did not feel that adding one would help sales. However, director Darren Aronofsky recorded a commentary track on his own and made the track available for free download on his personal website.
 In the DVD commentary for the first four series of the revived series of Doctor Who, any commentary featuring head writer Russell T Davies would begin with Davies stating "Hello faithful viewer". In the "Utopia" commentary, he humorously relayed to David Tennant that he had received a letter from a viewer asking him to stop doing this. However, Davies refused to do so and afterwards Tennant began using the phrase a lot himself.
 The special edition DVD of Child's Play did not feature any contributions from the director, Tom Holland, who claims he was not asked to contribute to it. In response, the website Icons of Fright contacted Holland and asked if he would be willing to record a commentary track that would be free for download on their website. He agreed, and the track is downloadable from here.
 Similarly, Icons of Fright offers two free downloadable commentaries for Fright Night, downloadable from here.
 Jonah: A VeggieTales Movie has three commentaries – voice actors/writers/directors Phil Vischer and Mike Nawrocki, producer Ameake Owens and art director Marc Vulcano, and Vischer and Nawrocki in character as Mr. Lunt and Larry the Cucumber respectively.

Music 
 The 2005 DVD of "Schism" from Tool, contains dual-commentary by David Yow.

In-theater audio commentary 
Kevin Smith coined the idea of in-theater audio commentary, going to see a movie at the theater, and after having downloaded onto one's iPod a podcast of an audio commentary, returning to the theater a second time to watch the movie while listening to the commentary at the same time.  As of right now, a few films have attempted to utilize this idea, including Smith's Clerks II, The Nines by writer/director John August, and Rian Johnson's The Brothers Bloom, Looper and Knives Out. August's blog lists "rules and guidelines" for how to use in-theater commentary.

Kevin Smith first recorded a commentary track for Clerks II around May 2006 a few months before its theatrical release that was to be downloaded through iTunes and listened to in the theaters, which was meant to appeal primarily to Smith's hardcore DVD-purchasing fan base. Theater owners, however, felt that allowing people to bring outside devices would be distracting and disrupting to other audience members. The commentary track was not released for download while the movie was in theaters and was instead included on the 2-disc Clerks II DVD.  The commentary track features Kevin Smith along with producer Scott Mosier and actor, Jeff Anderson.

An audio commentary track for The Nines featuring John August along with actor Ryan Reynolds was posted in m4a and mp3 formats onto August's blog. This film had a considerably more limited release than Clerks II, featured in only 5 theaters in the U.S.

Prolific commentators 

 Novelist and film historian Tim Lucas has recorded close to 100 audio commentaries since his first, for Mario Bava's Black Sunday in 1999. His varied output includes such titles as Alfred Hitchcock's Lifeboat (which won a 2018 Saturn Award for Best DVD/Blu-ray extra), the British Film Institute's set of five films by Alain Robbe-Grillet, and Sergio Leone's Dollars Trilogy, as well as numerous titles by Mario Bava and Jesús Franco.
 Hong Kong action cinema expert Bey Logan was a popular commentator for UK DVD distributors Hong Kong Legends and their sister label Premier Asia. He has recorded over sixty commentaries for Asian films, including Fist of Fury, Project A and The Young Master as well as modern hits Iron Monkey, Musa and Ong Bak. For the majority of his commentaries Logan was a solo commentator but occasionally he was joined by notable film makers and cast including Tsui Hark, Christy Chung, Donnie Yen and Maggie Q. He left Hong Kong Legends for The Weinstein Company in early 2006.
 U.S. film historian Rudy Behlmer has recorded commentaries for many classics of American cinema, most notably Casablanca, Gone with the Wind, The Adventures of Robin Hood and Frankenstein.
 U.S. film critic Roger Ebert has recorded DVD audio commentaries for many films, including Citizen Kane, Casablanca, Floating Weeds, Crumb, Dark City, and Beyond the Valley of the Dolls (for which Ebert also wrote the screenplay, based on a story that he co-wrote with Russ Meyer). Since losing his ability to speak due to illness, these recordings were also used to supply Ebert's collection of spoken words for his speech synthesizer since the soundtracks of his television show were too contaminated by background noise to use.
 U.S. film critic Richard Schickel has recorded DVD audio commentaries for many classic films, including Double Indemnity, Whirlpool, Side Street, Strangers on a Train, On the Waterfront, East of Eden, The Good, the Bad and the Ugly, Ryan's Daughter, Dirty Harry, The Big Red One, Once Upon a Time in America, and Unforgiven.
 U.S. writer and director Peter Bogdanovich has not only recorded commentaries for his own films (The Last Picture Show, The Cat's Meow, Paper Moon) but has also recorded commentaries for classic U.S. films, including Bringing Up Baby, Citizen Kane, The Lady from Shanghai, and Strangers on a Train. He also participated in the commentary for the pilot episode of The Sopranos.
 Matt Groening, creator of The Simpsons, has recorded commentary on most episodes of the show thus far released on DVD — , seasons one through ten — as well as every episode of his other creation, Futurama. , this totals over 250 episode commentaries. He has also provided commentaries on other Simpsons/Futurama related products, such as the music videos on The Simpsons: Season Two DVD. David X. Cohen, Groening's co-developer and occasional writer on Futurama, also provided commentary on every episode, as well as several installments of The Simpsons.
 Film directors Kevin Smith and David Fincher are notable fans of DVD audio commentary, and Fincher's "Platinum Series" release of Se7en was considered one of the most in-depth DVDs of its time, mainly due to the four audio commentary tracks, all of which feature Fincher, and cover the writing, the cast, the sound design and the cinematography. Another commentary for Se7en was included on the Criterion Collection laserdisc, which included cast member Gwyneth Paltrow, but this track has not been released on DVD. Smith's DVD for Clerks II features three audio commentaries, all featuring Smith, and he is known for bringing his stars, including Ben Affleck and Jason Lee onto his commentary tracks. Smith has recorded audio commentaries for all of his films except Zack and Miri Make a Porno, and also appeared on the Road House audio commentary after mentioning it on the 10th Anniversary DVD of Clerks. Smith has also appeared on the special edition Donnie Darko DVD, doing commentary with Richard Kelly. Fincher has recorded a track for all of his films except Alien 3, which he disowned after controversy over the production. Directors Terry Gilliam, Werner Herzog, Francis Ford Coppola, David Cronenberg, Paul Verhoeven and Steven Soderbergh are also highly respected as intelligent and informative commentators, often working with Criterion to create commentaries for their films. Soderbergh once said about DVD commentaries, "Would I, growing up, like to have had access to stuff on DVDs like this? Oh God, yeah! It's better than any film school, I think."
 Animation historians such as Jerry Beck and Michael Barrier regularly contribute commentary to selected shorts in DVD packages of animated shorts from the Golden Age of Hollywood, including the Looney Tunes Golden Collection series and the Popeye the Sailor DVD series.
 Ken Annakin's audio commentary for his 1965 classic Those Magnificent Men in Their Flying Machines holds a record for having one of the oldest surviving directors to commentate on a film. In addition to the commentary during the film, Annakin speaks on nearly 3 hours of backup material on the old classic airplanes that many fans consider the real stars of the film.

Alternate commentaries 
Originally inspired by a column by Roger Ebert, a small but active fan base of DVD commentary enthusiasts has sprung up since 2002 offering their own specially-recorded fan-made DVD commentaries. These tracks (usually made available in MP3 format) allow the fans to put forth their own opinions and expertise on a movie or TV series in much the same way as an on-disc commentary. These commentary tracks are played by starting a DVD player with the movie and an MP3 player with the track simultaneously. A substantial community of fan commentators exists, creating many hundreds of downloadable tracks available on the Web.

The idea of downloadable commentary tracks has since been co-opted by TV show creators themselves, as creators of TV shows such as the 2004 Battlestar Galactica, Star Trek: Enterprise, and the Doctor Who revival have recorded downloadable commentary tracks meant to be watched along with the episodes as recorded from TV.

Mystery Science Theater 3000 head writer and on-screen host Michael J. Nelson has started his own website to sell downloadable commentaries called RiffTrax. He also regularly commentates on the public domain films that colorizing company Legend Films releases on DVD, including Night of the Living Dead and Reefer Madness.

Critiques and parodies of the audio commentary 
The Audio Commentary has been a subject of discussion among filmmakers. Many directors see them as an unnecessary bonus feature, while others record "fake" commentaries, which may contain false information or inside jokes. Other filmmakers have parodied the commentary concept, as the following examples demonstrate.

 The Coen Brothers movie Blood Simple has a fake commentary written by the Coens and read by an actor posing as a film historian. This "historian", Kenneth Loring, gives information about the production that almost everyone would recognize as being totally ludicrous. He claims, for instance, that one the opening scene was shot upside down with the actors saying their lines backwards and that some roles were reserved for Rosemary Clooney and Gene Kelly.
 In an episode of The Simpsons ("The Bart Wants What It Wants"), Bart is watching an Itchy & Scratchy DVD and decides to turn the commentary on. A small box appears at the corner of the screen, showing Scratchy ("We shot this at four in the morning, and the crew was getting a little cranky") and Itchy ("You can never get enough takes for Steven Soderbergh"); midway through Scratchy's next sentence, Itchy cuts off his head.
 Welsh comedian Rob Brydon starred in the ITV comedy show Director's Commentary (2004) in which he played a fictional director, Peter De Lane, and parodied the often conceited and pompous nature of directors when giving DVD commentaries by articulating his thoughts over archive footage. Although the show was well received, it did not sustain viewer interest, and  only one six-episode season was produced.
 The book Speak, Commentary, by Jeff Alexander and Tom Bissell, collects a series of fake audio commentaries purportedly made by well-known American cultural critics and political pundits on popular science fiction and fantasy movies. The contents include Ann Coulter on Ridley Scott's Alien, as well as Noam Chomsky and Howard Zinn on Peter Jackson's films of J.R.R. Tolkien's The Lord of the Rings: The Fellowship of the Ring and The Lord of the Rings: The Two Towers.
 The DVD and Blu-ray for the musical web series Dr. Horrible's Sing-Along Blog contains two commentary tracks; one of which comprises an entirely second musical titled Commentary! The Musical, in which they parody the concept of both DVD commentaries and musicals in general. In addition to songs by the main cast members (often parodying their own public personas or each others), it includes numbers by unnamed extras in the film, and a song explaining how the 2007–2008 Writers Guild of America strike led to the creation of the web series.
 The Adam and Joe Show parodied audio commentaries in a sketch which stated that audio commentaries often sound like "self indulgent wankers in a pub".
 Webtoon Homestar Runner has featured the characters of the H*R universe doing commentaries for many of their cartoons. Most notably The King of Town DVD, In Search of the Yello Dello and the music video for They Might Be Giants' "Experimental Film."
 Anchorman: The Legend of Ron Burgundy contains audio commentary where the actors end up discussing very little of the film's content.
 Talladega Nights: The Ballad of Ricky Bobby features a commentary in which director Adam McKay fabricates nearly every piece of information about the film, such as the production's move to Brazil, the roles of Walker and Texas Ranger being played by robots, and that the original cut of the film was 9½ hours long and contained a segment of a stick of butter.
 Monty Python's The Meaning of Life features a fake commentary titled "Soundtrack for the Lonely: A Soundtrack for People Watching at Home Alone." It consists of a rather disgusting man played by Michael Palin who burps, yawns, flatulates, and talks under his breath while he watches the film at his flat. Throughout the commentary, he calls his friends (played by Terry Jones and Eric Idle) by telephone.
 The Hot Fuzz 3-disc collector's edition DVD includes a commentary featuring real policemen and a commentary in which director Edgar Wright and fellow filmmaker Quentin Tarantino discuss nearly 200 films and television series but barely make reference to Hot Fuzz.
In an episode of the series King of the Hill, Bobby listens to the audio commentary of a fictional film. The film's director remarks that "the sky wasn't sad enough" for the scene.
In the American Dad! episode "Bullocks to Stan", the fish character Klaus Heissler purposely begins to audibly give a commentary on the events of the episode; when Roger asks what he's doing, he says that he is acting as if the characters lives were on a DVD and he is the expert giving commentary on it. Near the end of the episode, his commentary can be heard over the events of the climactic fight between Stan and Bullock, despite the fact that Klaus is not present at this event like he is at previous events he comments on in the episode; he claims that the 'actor' playing the busboy was killed during the making of the episode, and at one point apologizes for talking over what he claims is the funniest line in the episode.
 The actual audio commentary for the episode mentions the joke that Klaus talked out was Stan saying "Kirk was a much better captain," Bullock saying "What," and Stan replying "Nothing".
In the film Tropic Thunder, Robert Downey Jr. plays an actor who refuses to break character until he completes the DVD commentary, and in the DVD commentary for the film, Downey indeed remains in character.
 Detective Pikachu includes a "Mr. Mime Audio Commentary", where he presents himself and shows he is going to make an audio commentary about the interrogation scene of the movie. However, it only plays the entire scene, and in the end, he expresses himself by the fact that since he cannot talk, the audio commentary plan was not the smartest idea.

Commentary re-use 
Some film companies transfer the audio commentary of the laserdisc release of a film on to the DVD rather than creating a new one. For example, El Mariachi Special Edition, Total Recall Special Edition, Spaceballs and A Nightmare on Elm Street all contain the commentary from the laserdisc release. This may be for financial reasons, depending on whether the rights to the original commentary are cheaper to use than recording a new one (a company releasing a film on DVD today may not be the same company who released it on laserdisc); or it could simply be that the original commentary does its job well without the need for an update. Contrastingly, some DVDs do not have a commentary even though the laserdisc release did (for example, Taxi Driver). This may be because the parties involved have not reached a publication agreement.

The audio commentaries of The Criterion Collection are often considered some of the finest and most informative commentaries ever made, and the Laserdisc releases of classic films can be highly priced because Criterion generally did not license their commentaries for use on later DVDs when the rights to films they have release revert to the studio, including the aforementioned Taxi Driver. But commentaries like that now appear on the Blu-ray versions of films.  Other notables include the commentary for The Silence of the Lambs (featuring stars Jodie Foster and Anthony Hopkins, along with director Jonathan Demme) and Terry Gilliam's tracks for The Adventures of Baron Munchausen and The Fisher King. In addition, the fact that Criterion have been commissioning commentaries since 1984 means that commentaries exist by film makers who died before the advent of DVD, such as Michael Powell.

Commentary exclusive to LaserDisc 
Some commentaries that were issued on Laserdisc have not been reissued or replaced on DVD. Sometimes this is because there was a deluxe LD edition while there has only been a bare bones release on DVD, for example The Fisher King.

In the case of the first three James Bond movies, Dr. No, From Russia with Love, and Goldfinger, the commentary was once released on LaserDisc but quickly judged inappropriate, never to return (new commentary tracks are on the DVD editions). The commentaries are available to download at The 007 Dossier.

Video games 
Some video games, such as the episodic sequels to Half-Life 2 and Tomb Raider: Anniversary, have experimented with audio commentaries. Unlike DVD commentaries, the systems used for video games do not use a predetermined continuous flow of speech, because the events of a game depend on the player's actions. Instead, in-game prompts are used to allow players to activate a relevant audio commentary for a specific area. The camera and action may also be altered to more readily showcase the developer's comments.

List of video games with audio commentary 
2000
Star Wars Episode I: Battle for Naboo, believed to be the earliest video game with audio commentary and the only known game cartridge with audio commentary.
2001
Star Wars Rogue Squadron II: Rogue Leader
2002
Sly Cooper and the Thievius Raccoonus
2004
The Chronicles of Riddick: Escape from Butcher Bay (PC version and as downloadable content for the Xbox 360 version)
2005
Half-Life 2: Lost Coast
Stubbs the Zombie
2006
Half-Life 2: Episode One
2007
Half-Life 2: Episode Two
Portal
Ratchet & Clank Future: Tools of Destruction
Team Fortress 2
Tomb Raider: Anniversary
flOw
2008
Left 4 Dead
Metal Gear Solid 4: Guns of the Patriots
2009
Left 4 Dead 2
Flower
2010
 Alan Wake
Monkey Island 2: LeChuck's Revenge Special Edition (original game released in 1991)
Amnesia: The Dark Descent
2011
Portal 2
2012
Journey
2013
Deus Ex Human Revolution Director's Cut
Gone Home
2014
The Last of Us Remastered
2015
Grim Fandango Remastered (original game released in 1998)
2016
Day of the Tentacle Remastered (original game released in 1993)
BioShock: The Collection
Firewatch ("Audio Tour" mode released as free downloadable content)
Duke Nukem 3D: 20th Anniversary World Tour (original game released in 1996)

Notes

References

External links 
 Rate That Commentary: Website devoted to user-submitted ratings and reviews of DVD audio commentary tracks.
 Commentary Tracks of the Damned: A feature of The Onion's A.V. Club focusing on the commentary tracks that accompany DVD releases of critical and/or box office flops.
 Sharecrow: Database of third-party DVD commentaries; offers synchronization software.
 www.dvdcommentaries.co.uk Alternative DVD Commentary Site
 "Becoming Book-Like: Bob Stein and the Future of the Book"

Alternative versions of soundtracks
Home video supplements
DVD
Blu-ray Disc
1980s neologisms